Fishing Derby is a fishing video game written by David Crane for the Atari Video Computer System (renamed to the Atari 2600 in 1982) and published by Activision in 1980. It's one of the first video games developed by Activision.

Gameplay

In Fishing Derby, two fishermen sit on opposite docks over a lake filled with fish (and a shark that passes through). Using the joystick the player is able to move the fishing line left, right, up, and down in the water. When a fish is hooked, the line slowly comes up to the surface of the water. Pressing the fire button on the joystick reels in the fish faster. However, if both fishermen have hooked fish, only one person can reel it in (the one who first hooked the fish). The shark that roams the water will try to eat hooked fish before they surface.

The objective for both fishermen is to reach 99 pounds of fish first. There are six rows of fish; the top two rows have 2 lb. fish, the middle two rows have 4 lb. fish and the two bottom rows have 6 lb. fish. The more valuable fish sit at the bottom, but they are harder to bring in as they run a higher risk of being eaten by the shark.

The game's two variants are simply single-player and multi-player.  In both games the objective is to reach 99 lb. of fish first.

Reception
In Video magazine's "Arcade Alley" column, Fishing Derby was characterized as "imaginative, colorful, and fun" providing children with "better animation than Saturday morning TV and provid[ing] adults with a subtle game of skill". Overall the reviewers recommended it as a family game.

See also

List of Atari 2600 games
List of Activision games: 1980–1999

References

External links
 Fishing Derby Atari Mania
 Fishing Derby at GameFAQs

1980 video games
Activision games
Atari 2600 games
Atari 2600-only games
Fishing video games
Multiplayer and single-player video games
Video games with underwater settings
Video games developed in the United States